Thelma Barlow (née Pigott; born 19 June 1929) is an English television actress and writer, known for her roles as Mavis Wilton in the long-running ITV soap opera Coronation Street and as Dolly Bellfield in the BBC One sitcom dinnerladies.

Early life
Barlow was born in 1929 in Middlesbrough, North Riding of Yorkshire, the younger of two daughters. Her father, Tommy, a cabinet maker, died of pneumonia five weeks before her birth, aged 37, and Barlow was brought up by her mother Margaret.

During her childhood the family moved to Huddersfield, West Riding of Yorkshire. Barlow left school at 15 and went to Huddersfield Technical College to study shorthand and typing. Her first job was as a secretary, which she held for eight years and at the same time belonged to an amateur dramatics group. Barlow decided to take up acting professionally and joined the Joan Littlewood Theatre Group. During the 1950s she did rep in Liverpool, Nottingham and Birmingham. In 1960 Barlow joined the West of England Theatre Company followed by the Bristol Old Vic Theatre Company. In Bristol she ran a boarding house for fellow actors.

Career
Barlow's earlier television appearance was in 1967's Becky Sharp. In 1971, while performing in Liverpool she was asked to audition for the soap opera Coronation Street for the role of Mavis Riley. She was successful and her first episode was transmitted on 11 August 1971, though the character only appeared regularly from 4 June 1973, where she joined veteran show actress Barbara Knox who plays Rita Fairclough in "The Kabin". Barlow remained in the series for 26 years, appearing in 1,787 episodes, until she left after the departure of her on-screen husband Derek. Her final episode was broadcast 10 October 1997 when Mavis moved to the Lake District. During her time on Coronation Street Barlow shared a flat with co-star Helen Worth and later moved to Settle, where she later did a TV show from her garden. In 2020, Barlow revealed that, despite being asked to return to Coronation Street, "two or three times" she has declined, "because I feel I’ve packed Mavis away in a box now. I don’t think I’d know how to do her anyway. Maybe a good script would make me realise how I’d played the part."

In 1990, she appeared as a contestant on Cluedo, facing off against Ned Sherrin.

Barlow's next major role was that of Dolly Bellfield in Victoria Wood's sitcom dinnerladies, which ran for two series from 1998 to 2000. In 1999 she appeared in Murder Most Horrid and David Copperfield. Since then Barlow has appeared as one-off characters in several television shows, including Fat Friends (2000), Doctors (2002), The Royal (2004), Where the Heart Is (2004), Agatha Christie's Marple (2006), the Midsomer Murders episode "Last Year's Model" (2006) and Doc Martin (2007). In 2005 she played her first film role in Mrs Henderson Presents, for which she was nominated "Most Promising Newcomer" at the British Independent Film Awards 2005. In 2007 she portrayed Lady Thaw in the Doctor Who episode "The Lazarus Experiment". In 2016, she had a small speaking role in the film Florence Foster Jenkins.

Since her departure from Coronation Street Barlow has also made stage appearances, with roles such as Madame Arcati in Blithe Spirit, Mam in Alan Bennett's Enjoy and as Abby Brewster in Arsenic and Old Lace in 2003 on the West End stage. Barlow has also acted on radio. In 2003, she moved to the Isle of Purbeck. Barlow has also written a book about her hobby, organic gardening, first published by Robson Books as Organic Gardening with Love (1992) and re-issued in paperback under the title Gardening Nature's Way. In June 2014, Barlow narrated a 30-minute documentary Gail & Me: 40 Years on Coronation Street which celebrated Helen Worth's career on Coronation Street as Gail Platt.

On 13 September 2021 Barlow appeared as a guest in the television documentary Coronation Street Icons: Norris Cole, a documentary about the character played by Malcolm Hebden after the actor's retirement.

Personal life
She married Graham Barlow in 1956. The marriage produced two children. The couple divorced in 1983. Barlow maintained her married name since all of her television and film credits, until her divorce, had been as Thelma Barlow.

Filmography

Honours
Barlow was awarded the Honorary degree of Doctor of Letters (D.Litt) from Teesside University on 21 November 2008.

References

External links

Thelma Barlow at corrie.net

1929 births
Living people
English film actresses
English soap opera actresses
English stage actresses
English television actresses
Actors from Middlesbrough
20th-century English actresses
21st-century English actresses
Actresses from Yorkshire
Organic gardeners